Vperyod is a rural locality (a selo) in Polyakovsky Selsoviet, Davlekanovsky District, Bashkortostan, Russia. The population was 957 as of 2010. There are 7 streets.

Geography 
Vperyod is located 12 km northeast of Davlekanovo (the district's administrative centre) by road. Mikhaylovka is the nearest rural locality.

References 

Rural localities in Davlekanovsky District